Agnew Lake is a lake in Mono County, California, in the United States.

Agnew Lake was named for Theodore C. Agnew, an early settler.

See also
List of lakes in California

References

Lakes of California
Lakes of Mono County, California
Lakes of Northern California